Napoleon is an upcoming epic historical drama film directed and produced by Ridley Scott and written by David Scarpa. It stars Joaquin Phoenix as Napoleon and depicts the French leader's rise to power. The film is scheduled to be released on Apple TV+.

Premise
The film depicts Napoleon's rise to power through the lens of his addictive and volatile relationship with Empress Joséphine.

Cast

 Joaquin Phoenix as Napoleon Bonaparte
 Vanessa Kirby as Empress Joséphine
 Tahar Rahim as Paul Barras
 Ben Miles as Caulaincourt
 Ludivine Sagnier as Theresa Cabarrus
 Matthew Needham as Lucien Bonaparte
 Youssef Kerkour as General Davout
 Phil Cornwell as Sanson 'The Bourreau'
 Edouard Philipponnat as Tsar Alexander
 Ian McNeice
 Paul Rhys as Talleyrand
 John Hollingworth as Marshal Ney
 Gavin Spokes as Moulins

Production

Development
On October 14, 2020, the same day his film The Last Duel wrapped filming, Ridley Scott announced Kitbag as his next project for 20th Century Studios, which he would direct and produce from a screenplay written by Scott's All the Money in the World collaborator David Scarpa. The film's title was derived from the saying, "There is a general's staff hidden in every soldier's kitbag." The film is now titled Napoleon. Joaquin Phoenix was reportedly attached to star as the French general and Emperor of France Napoléon Bonaparte, reuniting him with the director after Gladiator in 2000. However, when Scott's deal with 20th Century Studios concluded by the end of the year, the project became available to other major studios. In January 2021, Apple Studios announced its commitment to finance and produce the film, with shooting scheduled to take place in the United Kingdom in 2022. "Napoleon is a man I've always been fascinated by", Scott said in a statement, "He came out of nowhere to rule everything — but all the while he was waging a romantic war with his adulterous wife Joséphine. He conquered the world to try to win her love, and when he couldn't, he conquered it to destroy her, and destroyed himself in the process."

The Last Duel actress Jodie Comer was reportedly Scott's first choice to play Empress Joséphine. She entered negotiations to star in March 2021, confirmed her casting in September, and said, "I just jumped at the chance to work with Ridley and his team again and the idea of working with Joaquin, who's someone who I hugely admire ... I'm so excited to delve into that world." In November, she said her role was "going to be another huge challenge, but what I love about period dramas is that kind of transformation. Even now, doing some costume and hair tests for Kitbag, it's just so exciting because it becomes so much easier to step out of yourself and into somebody else." That same month, Youssef Kerkour was confirmed to star. On January 4, 2022, Comer revealed her departure from the film due to scheduling changes caused by the COVID-19 pandemic. Vanessa Kirby was announced as her replacement later that day. On January 18, 2022, producer Kevin J. Walsh said the film had been retitled Napoleon. In February, Tahar Rahim was added to the cast.

Filming

Production began in February 2022. The film will feature six major battle sequences, unlike another film featuring Napoleon, Waterloo (1970), that focused on a single battle. Napoleon was shot under the working title Marengo, a reference to the Battle of Marengo (1800). Filming took place in Lincoln, England, in March 2022. The crew reportedly spent a week to prepare Lincoln Cathedral, which stood in for Notre-Dame de Paris. Shooting took place in the cathedral on March 17 and March 18, between 7am and 7pm.

Filming also took place at Stowe Avenue and House, Buckinghamshire; Blenheim Palace in Woodstock, Oxfordshire; West Wycombe Park in Buckinghamshire, England;, Petworth House in Sussex, England, and Boughton House in Kettering, England. It was also set to shoot in Malta for three weeks, starting in May 2022. Fort Ricasoli in Kalkara, Malta, is set to be transformed into the site of 1793's siege of Toulon, where Napoleon had his first victory.

References

External links
 

American epic films
American historical drama films
American war drama films
Apple TV+ original films
Films about Napoleon
British epic films
British historical drama films
British war drama films
Films directed by Ridley Scott
Films set in Paris
Films set in the 18th century
Films set in the 19th century
Films shot in Lincolnshire
Films shot in Malta
Scott Free Productions films
Upcoming English-language films
Upcoming films